The following outline is provided as an overview of and topical guide to biochemistry:

Biochemistry – study of chemical processes in living organisms, including living matter. Biochemistry governs all living organisms and living processes.

Applications of biochemistry
 Testing
 Ames test – salmonella bacteria is exposed to a chemical under question (a food additive, for example), and changes in the way the bacteria grows are measured. This test is useful for screening chemicals to see if they mutate the structure of DNA and by extension identifying their potential to cause cancer in humans.
 Pregnancy test – one uses a urine sample and the other a blood sample. Both detect the presence of the hormone human chorionic gonadotropin (hCG). This hormone is produced by the placenta shortly after implantation of the embryo into the uterine walls and accumulates.
 Breast cancer screening – identification of risk by testing for mutations in two genes—Breast Cancer-1 gene (BRCA1) and the Breast Cancer-2 gene (BRCA2)—allow a woman to schedule increased screening tests at a more frequent rate than the general population.
 Prenatal genetic testing – testing the fetus for potential genetic defects, to detect chromosomal abnormalities such as Down syndrome or birth defects such as spina bifida.
 PKU test – Phenylketonuria (PKU) is a metabolic disorder in which the individual is missing an enzyme called phenylalanine hydroxylase. Absence of this enzyme allows the buildup of phenylalanine, which can lead to mental retardation.
 Genetic engineering – taking a gene from one organism and placing it into another. Biochemists inserted the gene for human insulin into bacteria.  The bacteria, through the process of translation, create human insulin.
 Cloning – Dolly the sheep was the first mammal ever cloned from adult animal cells. The cloned sheep was, of course, genetically identical to the original adult sheep.  This clone was created by taking cells from the udder of a six-year-old ewe and growing them in the lab.
 Gene therapy – a modified or healthy gene is inserted into the organism to replace a disease-causing gene. Commonly a virus that has been altered to carry human DNA is used to deliver the healthy gene to the targeted cells of the patient. This process was first used successfully in 1990 on a four-year-old patient who lacked an immune system due to a rare genetic disease called severe combined immunodeficiency (SCID).

Branches of biochemistry

Main branches
Animal biochemistry
Plant biochemistry
Metabolism
Enzymology

Other branches
Biotechnology,
Bioluminescence,
Molecular chemistry,
Enzymatic chemistry,
Genetic engineering,
Pharmaceuticals,
Endocrinology,
Neurochemistry
Hematology,
Nutrition,
Photosynthesis,
Environmental,
Toxicology

History of biochemistry

General biochemistry concepts 
Major categories of bio-compounds:
Carbohydrates : sugar – disaccharide – polysaccharide – starch – glycogen
Lipids : fatty acid – fats – essential oils – oils – waxes – cholesterol
Nucleic acids : DNA – RNA – mRNA – tRNA – rRNA – codon – adenosine – cytosine – guanine – thymine – uracil
Proteins :
amino acid – glycine – arginine – lysine
peptide – primary structure – secondary structure – tertiary structure – conformation – protein folding
Chemical properties:
molecular bond – covalent bond – ionic bond – hydrogen bond – ester – ethyl
molecular charge – hydrophilic – hydrophobic – polar
pH – acid – alkaline – base
oxidation – reduction – hydrolysis
Structural compounds:
In cells: flagellin – peptidoglycan – myelin – actin – myosin
In animals: chitin – keratin – collagen – silk
In plants: cellulose – lignin – cell wall
Enzymes and enzyme activity:
enzyme kinetics – enzyme inhibition
proteolysis – ubiquitin – proteasome
kinase – dehydrogenase
Membranes : fluid mosaic model – diffusion – osmosis
phospholipids – glycolipid – glycocalyx – antigen – isoprene
ion channel – proton pump – electron transport – ion gradient – antiporter – symporter – quinone – riboflavin
Energy pathways :
pigments : chlorophyll – carotenoids – xanthophyll – cytochrome – phycobilin – bacteriorhodopsin – hemoglobin – myoglobin – absorption spectrum – action spectrum – fluorescence
Photosynthesis : light reaction – dark reaction
Fermentation : Acetyl-CoA – lactic acid
Cellular respiration : Adenosine triphosphate (ATP) – NADH – pyruvate – oxalate – citrate
Chemosynthesis
Regulation
hormones : auxin
signal transduction – growth factor – transcription factor – protein kinase – SH3 domain
Malfunctions : tumor – oncogene – tumor suppressor gene
Receptors : Integrin – transmembrane receptor – ion channel
Techniques : electrophoresis – chromatography – mass spectrometry – x-ray diffraction – Southern blot – fractionation – Gram stain – Surface Plasmon Resonance  – Microscale Thermophoresis

Biochemical techniques

Molecular genetics
DNA sequencing
Polymerase chain reaction
Northern blotting
Southern blotting
Fusion proteins
DNA microarray
Bioinformatics
Flow cytometry

Protein purification
Western blotting
Chromatography
ELISA

Structural determination
X-ray crystallography
NMR
Electron microscopy
Molecular dynamics
Mass spectrometry
Isotopic labeling

Interactions between biomolecules
Coimmunoprecipitation
Electrophoretic mobility shift assay
Southwestern blotting

External links 

Biochemistry, 5th ed. Full text of Berg, Tymoczko, and Stryer, courtesy of NCBI.
Biochemistry, 2nd ed. Full text of Garrett and Grisham.

Biochemistry
Biochemistry
 
 
Biochemistry topics
Biochemistry
Biochemistry terminology